The Geneva Open is an ATP Tour (formerly Grand Prix) affiliated tennis tournament that was held annually from 1980 to 1991 in Geneva, Switzerland on clay courts.
In November 2014 the ATP announced that the Düsseldorf tournament would be moved to Geneva where it would be held in 2015 as a 250 tournament.

Mats Wilander, Stan Wawrinka, and Casper Ruud are the singles record-holders, each with two back-to-back editions won.
Mate Pavić is the doubles record-holder with three wins, two with Oliver Marach and one with Nikola Mektić. 

Balázs Taróczy is the only player to win both singles and doubles title the same year.

Past finals

Singles

Doubles

External links
Official Website

 
Tennis tournaments in Switzerland
Clay court tennis tournaments
Grand Prix tennis circuit
ATP Tour
1980 establishments in Switzerland
1991 disestablishments in Switzerland
Recurring sporting events established in 1980
Recurring events disestablished in 1991
Annual sporting events in Switzerland
2015 establishments in Switzerland
Recurring sporting events established in 2015
Sports competitions in Geneva